Ismaël Karba Bangoura (born 8 November 1994) is a Guinean footballer playing as a left defender.

Career
Born in Port Kamsar, Bangoura started his career at Italian side Inter Milan, playing for the club's youth side; in January 2013 he joined Cesena alongside Yago Del Piero, in a definitive deal and a temporary deal respectively.

On 18 May 2013 Bangoura made his professional debut, coming on as a second-half substitute in a 1–1 home draw against Pro Vercelli.

On 7 July 2014 he left for San Marino Calcio

On 16 July 2015 he was signed by the Lega Pro side Andria for a 1-year temporary deal.

On 9 August 2016 he was signed by Maceratese.

References

External links

1994 births
Living people
Guinean footballers
Guinean expatriate footballers
Association football defenders
Serie B players
Serie C players
Maltese Premier League players
Inter Milan players
A.C. Cesena players
S.S. Fidelis Andria 1928 players
A.S.D. Victor San Marino players
Mosta F.C. players
S.S. Maceratese 1922 players
S.S. Virtus players
Guinean expatriate sportspeople in Italy
Expatriate footballers in Italy
Expatriate footballers in Malta
Expatriate footballers in San Marino